The Nationalist Congress Party ( NCP) is one of the national parties in India. The party generally supports Indian nationalism and Gandhian secularism. It is the largest opposition party in Maharashtra and third largest party in Nagaland. It is also a significant party in other states.

Party formation and performance
The NCP was formed on 10 June 1999, by Sharad Pawar, P. A. Sangma, and Tariq Anwar after they were expelled from the Indian National Congress on 20 May 1999, for disputing the right of Italian-born Sonia Gandhi to lead the party.  When the NCP formed, the Indian Congress (Socialist) – Sarat Chandra Sinha party merged into the new party.

Despite the NCP being founded on opposition to the leadership of Sonia Gandhi, the party joined the Congress-led United Progressive Alliance (UPA) to form the government of Maharashtra in October 1999. In 2004, the party joined the UPA to form the national government led by Manmohan Singh. The NCP's leader, Sharad Pawar served as the Minister of Agriculture for both five-year terms of the Singh-led government. The party remained part of the Congress-led Maharashtra state government until 2014. On 20 June 2012, P. A. Sangma left the NCP to contest the presidential election, which he lost. In the April and May 2014 Lok Sabha elections, the UPA lost to the rival National Democratic Alliance (NDA) led by Narendra Modi and the NCP was out of government for the first time in ten years. The NCP broke its alliance with the Congress Party just before the October 2014 Maharashtra Legislative Assembly elections to contest them on its own. In the assembly election the Bharatiya Janata Party (BJP) emerged as the largest party and formed a minority government, initially with support from the NCP.

In April 2019, voting took place for the 48 Lok Sabha seats from Maharashtra. The Congress and NCP had a seat-sharing arrangement. Similarly, despite their differences, the BJP and Shiv Sena once again contested the elections together under the NDA banner. The election was another landslide victory for the NDA, with the BJP and Shiv Sena winning 23 and 18 seats, respectively, out of the total of the state's 48 Lok Sabha seats. The Congress Party won only one seat in the state whereas the NCP won five seats from its stronghold of western Maharashtra.

During the October 2019 Maharashtra Legislative Assembly elections, the BJP–Shiv-Sena and NCP–Congress alliances remained intact for seat sharing. The BJP and Shiv Sena together gained the majority of seats in the assembly but could not form a government due to disagreements between the two parties. The BJP, with 105 seats, was far short of the 145 seats required to form a majority and declined to form a minority government. As a result, Shiv Sena started talks with the NCP and Congress to form a government. However, in a controversial move, on 23 November 2019, the BJP formed a government with support from the NCP, with Ajit Pawar as Deputy Chief Minister. This government collapsed three days later with Chief Minister Devendra Fadnavis and Pawar resigning their respective positions. Finally, the NCP came back into power at the state level as part of the Maha Vikas Aghadi coalition formed with Shiv Sena and the Congress. On 28 November 2019, the governor of Maharashtra swore in Shiv Sena chief Uddhav Thackeray as the new Chief Minister of Maharashtra. Thackeray's cabinet included ministers from the NCP in key portfolios.

However this alliance lost power in June 2022 after a rebel faction led by Shiv Sena leader Eknath Shinde gathered the support of a majority of Sena MLAs and reestablished the previous Sena-BJP coalition. Subsequently, on 20 July, NCP President Sharad Pawar dissolved almost all units of the party.

Ideology 
The Mumbai President of the NCP Nawab Malik said that the party advocates for Indian reunification, the proposal that India, Pakistan and Bangladesh become one country. Malik compared this to German reunification: "If the Berlin wall can be demolished then why not India, Pakistan, and Bangladesh come together?"

Party symbol
The election symbol of NCP is an analogue alarm clock. The clock is drawn in blue and has two legs and an alarm button. It is situated on a tri-coloured Indian flag.

Party leadership
The party's primary base is the state of Maharashtra and its leadership reflects that. Since the 1980s, Indian politics has become more dynastic, possibly due to the absence of a party organization, independent civil society associations that mobilize support for the party, and centralized financing of elections. This phenomenon is seen from the national level down to the district level. In that regard, the NCP is considered the party with the highest level of dynasticism in Indian politics. The party founder, Sharad Pawar has many members of his family such as his daughter Supriya Sule and nephew Ajit Pawar holding prominent positions in the party.

Electoral performance

General elections

State Legislative Assembly elections

List of Rajya Sabha members

State Presidents

See also
 Politics of India
 List of political parties in India
 Maharashtra Rashtravadi Congress
 Politics of Maharashtra

References

External links
 
 Original Hosted Website Of NCP from 2007 AD (originally https://www.nationalistcongressparty.com)

 
Centrist parties in Asia
Indian nationalist political parties
Liberal parties in India
Liberalism in India
Socialist parties in India
Political parties established in 1999
1999 establishments in India
National political parties in India
Maharashtra